Zhang Lie (Pinyin: Zhāng Liè; born 25 May 1982) is a Chinese footballer who currently plays for Beijing Renhe in the China League One.

Club career
Zhang Lie would start his football career playing for his local top-tier football team Shenyang Haishi in the 2000 league season and would eventually establish himself as the team's first choice goalkeeper by the club's manager Zhang Guangying at the beginning of the 2004 season, where he would go on to play in twenty-two league games throughout the campaign. After a campaign that saw Shenyang underperformed at the end of the season, the club would bring in a new manager in Martin Koopman who decided that he wanted to bring in Guo Chunquan and Wang Lüe into the team, which saw Zhang dropped to third choice goalkeeper throughout the 2005 season. The beginning of the 2006 season saw the club bring in a new goalkeeper in Song Zhenyu to add even more competition within goal and Zhang would have to prove himself towards Koopman, however while he was given the first game of the season, Song would quickly be promoted to first choice. Zhang spent most of the season as second choice throughout the campaign.

In 2007, Zhang was allowed to leave Shenyang, however he struggled to find a new club to play for and would retire from playing to take up a job with Liaoning Guangyuan as a goalkeeping coach. After a year out, Zhang was given a chance to revitalize his career with third-tier club Shenyang Dongjin who he saw win the division title and promotion to the second tier. The following season would see Zhang not only help establish Shenyang Dongjin within the league, but his impressive performances saw him guide the club to third and just miss out on a double promotion to the top tier. Zhang would go on to draw the attentions of top-tier side Shaanxi Renhe who were interested in his services at the beginning of the 2011 season after they found out that his contract coming to an end, however Shenyang Dongjin believed that Zhang had agreed upon a contract extension and was only up for sale at 2,000,000 yuan. The case would be heard by the Chinese Football Association who ruled that Zhang did not sign a contract extension and was free to join Shaanxi Renhe. The club was later relocated and was renamed Guizhou Renhe. He appeared in every minute of the 2012 league season, playing in all 30 Super League games for Guizhou Renhe, as the club achieved fourth place in the league and runners-up in the FA Cup and gained the entry into AFC Champions League for the first time.

International career
While playing in the 2004 league season for Shenyang Haishi he would be called up to the Chinese national football team for the first time for several training sessions under head coach Arie Haan, however, it wasn't until 2011 when Zhang joined Guizhou Renhe did he show maturity in goal and was called up to the national team again. After six years out of the international scene, then manager Gao Hongbo would not only call him up for a friendly but try Zhang out in a game against North Korea on 8 June 2011 in a 2-0 victory.

Career statistics
Statistics accurate as of match played 14 October 2020.

Honours

Club
Shenyang Dongjin
China League Two: 2008

Guizhou Renhe
 Chinese FA Cup: 2013
 Chinese FA Super Cup: 2014

References

External links
 
 
 Player stats at sohu.com

1982 births
Living people
Footballers from Shenyang
Chinese footballers
China international footballers
Changsha Ginde players
Shenyang Dongjin players
Beijing Renhe F.C. players
Chinese Super League players
China League One players
China League Two players
Association football goalkeepers